Brachymeles burksi, the Burks' burrowing skink, is a species of skink endemic to the Philippines. It occurs on the islands of Mindoro and Marinduque.

Brachymeles burksi measures  in snout–vent length. It has short, digitless limbs (many Brachymeles are limbless).

References

Brachymeles
Reptiles of the Philippines
Endemic fauna of the Philippines
Reptiles described in 1917
Taxa named by Edward Harrison Taylor